Angela "Angy" Eiter (born 27 January 1986 in Arzl im Pitztal) is an Austrian professional rock climber. She is a champion in lead climbing competitions, winning three IFSC Lead Climbing World Cups in a row, from 2004 to 2006 and four IFSC World Championships. In 2011, she achieved her 25th win in World Cup and her 42nd podium.  She is also one of the strongest sport climbers in the world, and in 2017, became the first-ever female in history to climb a  route, La Planta de Shiva.  In 2020, she became the first-ever female in history to complete the first free ascent of a  route, Madame Ching.

Climbing career

Competition climbing
Eiter started climbing at age eleven when her school offered her the chance to try the sport. Her parents accompanied her to the climbing gym in Imst. At fifteen, she climbed her first indoor . In 2002, having reached the age of sixteen, she began to participate in the World Cup lead climbing.

In 2003, she won her first Cup race at Aprica. Since then she has won three World Cups in a row: in 2004, in 2005, winning eight out of nine events and in 2006, winning seven out of ten events.  She won four world championships in the lead climbing specialty: the 2005 edition in Munich, the 2007 edition in Avilés, the 2011 edition in Arco, and the 2012 edition in Paris.

For her achievements she was awarded the La Sportiva Competition Award in 2006.

In September 2008, during the third round of the World Cup in Bern, she had a serious accident damaging her left shoulder, for which she underwent arthroscopic surgery. She had to prematurely end the season and deal with nine months' rehabilitation. She started to compete the following July at the Climbing World Championship 2009 in Qinghai.

Rock climbing

On September 6, 2014, Eiter climbed the  route Hades at Nassereith, Austria. She is the sixth woman to climb this grade or higher.  On October 22, 2017, she climbed La Planta de Shiva (Villanueva del Rosario, Spain), widely considered to be a  route, becoming the world's first-ever female to climb at grade.  In 2020, she did the first free ascent (FFA) of Madame Ching (which she named after Ching Shih) in Imst, Austria, and suggested the grade of 9b (5.15b) for it, which would make it the world's first-ever female FFA at that grade.

Rankings

Climbing World Cup

Climbing World Championships

Climbing European Championships

Number of medals in the Climbing World Cup

Lead

Notable ascents

Redpointed routes 
:
 La Planta de Shiva - Villanueva del Rosario (ESP) - October 22, 2017 - World's first-ever female ascent of a 9b route.
Madame Ching - Tyrol (AUT) - December 2020 - World's first-ever new 9b route created by a female.

:
 Pure Dreaming - Arco (ITA) - June 2019
 Era Vella - Margalef (ESP) - April 2015
 Big Hammer - Pinswang (AUT) - November 2014
 Hades - Götterwandl (AUT) - September 6, 2014

:
 Hercules - Götterwandl (AUT) - October 2014 - First ascent
 Ingravids Extension - Santa Linya (ESP) - November 2010
 Claudio Café - Terra Promessa (ITA) -  2007

:
 White Zombie - Baltzola Cave (ESP) - 2009
 Strelovod - Misja Pec (SLO) - 2008
 Bodybuilding - Bürs (AUT) - 2007
 Nobody is Perfect - Bürs (AUT) - 2007

Onsighted routes 
:
 Skyline - Bürs (AUT) - 2006

Boulder problems 
:
 Fragile steps - Rocklands (ZAF) - August 2014

See also 
List of grade milestones in rock climbing
History of rock climbing
Rankings of most career IFSC gold medals

References

External links

 
 

 

Female climbers
Austrian rock climbers
1986 births
Living people
World Games gold medalists
Competitors at the 2005 World Games
People from Imst District
Sportspeople from Tyrol (state)
21st-century Austrian women
IFSC Climbing World Championships medalists
IFSC Climbing World Cup overall medalists